Pexicopia melitolicna is a moth of the family Gelechiidae. It was described by Edward Meyrick in 1935. It is found in Korea and China (Shandong, Anhui, Jiangsu, Jiangxi).

References

Moths described in 1935
Pexicopia